Burundi produced in 2018:

 2.3 million tons of cassava;
 1.6 million tons of banana;
 583 thousand tons of sweet potato;
 556 thousand tons of vegetable;
 393 thousand tons of beans;
 302 thousand tons of potato;
 290 thousand tons of maize;
 178 thousand tons of sugar cane;
 85 thousand tons of palm oil;
 56 thousand tons of taro;
 55 thousand tons of rice;
 53 thousand tons of tea;

In addition to smaller productions of other agricultural products, like sorghum (28 thousand tons) and coffee (14 thousand tons).

References